Dune (titled onscreen as Dune: Part One) is a 2021 American epic science fiction film directed by Denis Villeneuve from a screenplay by Villeneuve, Jon Spaihts, and Eric Roth. It is the first part of a two-part adaptation of the 1965 novel by Frank Herbert. Set in the distant future, the film follows Paul Atreides as his family, the noble House Atreides, is thrust into a war for the deadly and inhospitable desert planet Arrakis. The ensemble cast includes Timothée Chalamet, Rebecca Ferguson, Oscar Isaac, Josh Brolin, Stellan Skarsgård, Dave Bautista, Stephen McKinley Henderson, Zendaya, David Dastmalchian, Chang Chen, Sharon Duncan-Brewster, Charlotte Rampling, Jason Momoa, and Javier Bardem.

The film is the second theatrical adaptation of Dune following David Lynch's 1984 film, and the third adaptation overall following both the David Lynch film and John Harrison's 2000 miniseries. After an unsuccessful attempt by Paramount Pictures to produce a new adaptation, Legendary Entertainment acquired the Dune film and TV rights in 2016, with Villeneuve signing on as director in February 2017. Production contracts were only secured for the first film, relying on its success before a second film would be greenlit after the first film's release. Filming took place from March to July 2019 at locations including Budapest, Jordan, Norway, and Abu Dhabi.

Dune was originally scheduled for a late 2020 release, but it was delayed by the COVID-19 pandemic. The film premiered the following year at the 78th Venice International Film Festival on September 3, 2021, ahead of its international release on September 15, 2021. It was then released in United States theaters and streaming on HBO Max on October 22 and was well received by critics and audiences, with praise for Villeneuve's direction and screenplay, the visuals, effects, sound design, cinematography, editing, ambition, and Zimmer's musical score. The film was a box office success and it was the 12th highest grossing film of the year despite being released on HBO Max on same day. Organizations such as the National Board of Review and the American Film Institute named Dune as one of the top 10 films of 2021. Among its numerous awards and nominations, it received 10 nominations at the 94th Academy Awards, including Best Picture and Best Adapted Screenplay, and won the most awards of the ceremony with six: Best Sound, Best Original Score (by Hans Zimmer), Best Film Editing, Best Production Design, Best Visual Effects, and Best Cinematography. A sequel, Dune: Part Two, is set to be released on November 3, 2023.

Plot

In a distant future universe, Duke Leto of House Atreides, ruler of the planet Caladan, is assigned by the Padishah Emperor Shaddam IV of House Corrino to replace House Harkonnen as the fiefholder of Arrakis, a harsh desert planet and sole source of "spice", a valuable psychotropic drug that imparts heightened vitality and awareness. Spice is key to interstellar travel, giving Spacing Guild Navigators the prescience needed for transportation via heighliners. Shaddam plots for House Harkonnen to retake Arrakis, secretly aided by his Sardaukar troops, to destroy House Atreides. Leto is suspicious of the Emperor but weighs the risks against the power of controlling Arrakis and making an alliance with its mysterious natives, the Fremen.

Leto's concubine, Lady Jessica, is an acolyte of the Bene Gesserit, an exclusive sisterhood with advanced physical and mental abilities. As part of a centuries-long breeding program to produce a superbeing they call the Kwisatz Haderach, they had instructed her to bear a daughter. Jessica disobeyed and bore a son, Paul. He is intensively trained by Leto's aides, Duncan Idaho, Gurney Halleck, the Suk doctor Wellington Yueh, and the Mentat Thufir Hawat, while Jessica teaches him Bene Gesserit disciplines. Paul tells Jessica about his troubling visions. In response, the Bene Gesserit Reverend Mother and Imperial Truthsayer, Mohiam, visits Caladan and subjects him to a death-alternative test to assess his humanity and impulse control, which he passes. Later, Mohiam insists that Baron Harkonnen spare Paul and Jessica during the coup, to which he duplicitously agrees.

House Atreides arrives at Arrakeen, the fortress stronghold on Arrakis. Duncan's advance party has made contact with the Fremen. The natives revere Paul and Jessica, which Jessica explains is due to the Bene Gesserit sowing beliefs on Arrakis centuries earlier. Leto negotiates with Fremen chieftain, Stilgar, and meets the Imperial Judge of the Change Dr. Kynes, whose eye-color and stillsuit is of Freman fashion. Kynes briefs them on the dangers of spice harvesting, and the giant sandworms which travel under the desert and make the use of Holtzman shields unwise. During a flight, they spot a sandworm approaching a spice harvester with a stranded crew, whom they rescue. Paul's exposure to the spice triggers intense premonitions.

An attempt to assassinate Paul with a hunter-seeker fails. Yueh betrays them and disables Arrakeen's shields, allowing the Harkonnen and Sardaukar to invade. The Suk doctor penetrates Leto's Holtzman shield and incapacitates him for the Baron, in order to exchange the Duke for Yueh's captive wife. He replaces one of Leto's teeth with a poison gas capsule with which he can assassinate the Baron. Yueh is killed by the Baron, who had earlier killed his wife. Leto releases the gas, killing himself and the Baron's Mentat, Piter De Vries, but the Baron survives. The Baron had arranged to have Paul and Jessica dropped deep in the desert to die. Jessica uses a Bene Gesserit technique called "the Voice" to overpower and kill their captors. They overnight in the desert where Paul, surrounded by spice, has visions of a bloody "holy war" fought across the universe in his name.

Baron Harkonnen gives command of Arrakis to his nephew, Rabban, and orders him to restart spice production to recover his costs. Paul and Jessica are found by Duncan and Kynes. They head to an old research station. Paul discloses his plan to marry one of Shaddam's daughters to avert the civil war that will ensue from news of the Emperor's treachery. They are found by the Sardaukar, who have a lasgun. Duncan sacrifices himself to allow them to escape. Kynes is mortally wounded by Sardaukar but summons a sandworm that devours them. In the deep desert, Paul and Jessica encounter Stilgar's tribe, including Chani, the girl in Paul's visions. Fremen warrior Jamis challenges Stilgar's lenience to them and challenges Paul to a ritual duel to the death, which Paul wins. Against Jessica's wishes, Paul joins the Fremen to fulfill his father's goal of harnessing the power of Arrakis and its people.

Cast

 Timothée Chalamet as Paul Atreides, ducal heir of House Atreides
 Rebecca Ferguson as Lady Jessica, Paul's Bene Gesserit mother and consort to Leto
 Oscar Isaac as Duke Leto Atreides, Paul's father and the leader of House Atreides
 Josh Brolin as Gurney Halleck, weapons master of House Atreides and one of Paul's mentors
 Stellan Skarsgård as Baron Vladimir Harkonnen, leader of House Harkonnen, enemy to House Atreides, and former steward of Arrakis
 Dave Bautista as Glossu Rabban, nephew of Baron Harkonnen
 Sharon Duncan-Brewster as Dr. Liet Kynes, Imperial ecologist and Judge of the Change on Arrakis
 Stephen McKinley Henderson as Thufir Hawat, the Mentat of House Atreides
 Zendaya as Chani, a mysterious young Fremen woman who appears in Paul's visions
 Chang Chen as Dr. Wellington Yueh, a Suk doctor in the employ of House Atreides
 Charlotte Rampling as Reverend Mother Mohiam, the Emperor's Bene Gesserit Truthsayer
 Jason Momoa as Duncan Idaho, the swordmaster of House Atreides and one of Paul's mentors
 Javier Bardem as Stilgar, the leader of the Fremen tribe at Sietch Tabr
 David Dastmalchian as Piter De Vries, the Mentat of House Harkonnen
 Babs Olusanmokun as Jamis, a Fremen from Sietch Tabr
 Golda Rosheuvel as Shadout Mapes, a Fremen working as a housekeeper for House Atreides
 Roger Yuan as Lieutenant Lanville, Gurney Halleck's second-in-command

In addition, Benjamin Clementine appears as the Herald of the Change, the head of an Imperial delegation to Caladan, while Joelle and Dora Kápolnai-Schvab play Baron Harkonnen’s servants, and the trio of Marianne Faithfull, Jean Gilpin, and Ellen Dubin voice the ancestral Bene Gesserit whose voices are heard by Paul in his visions. The film's editor, Joe Walker, provides the narration for Paul's filmbooks.

Production

Background

Shortly after publication in 1965, Dune was identified for potential film prospects and the rights to adapt the novel to film have been held by several producers since 1971. Attempts to make a film were made and it was considered to be "unfilmable" owing to its breadth of content. Because of the book's status among fans, any deviation from the original material without strong justification has the potential to harm the film's reputation.

Alejandro Jodorowsky acquired the rights in the 1970s to make an extravagant fourteen-hour adaptation of the book but the project fell through. This effort became the subject of the documentary film Jodorowsky's Dune, released in 2013. David Lynch's Dune, produced by Raffaella De Laurentiis in 1984, was intended as a three-hour film but was cut to 137 minutes; it was poorly received and Lynch himself ended up disowning it. In 1996, the producer Richard P. Rubinstein acquired the rights to the novel. A live-action miniseries produced by Rubinstein and directed by John Harrison, Frank Herbert's Dune, aired on the Sci Fi Channel in 2000; it was a ratings hit and was generally better received than Lynch's film. Some reviewers criticized the miniseries for lacking the spectacle afforded to a feature film production and for staying too faithful to the book and being dragged down by exposition. Prospects to make a successful adaptation of Dune improved after the critical and commercial success of the film series adaptations of The Lord of the Rings and Harry Potter, both of which maintained most of the works' key characters and plots while managing the limited running time. In 2008, Paramount Pictures brought on Peter Berg to direct an adaptation. Berg left the project in October 2009, with director Pierre Morel brought on to direct in January 2010. Paramount dropped the project in March 2011, as they could not come to key agreements, with their rights reverting to Rubinstein.

Development

In 2011, Mary Parent, vice chair of worldwide production for Legendary Entertainment, and Cale Boyter, her producer partner, managed to acquire adaptation rights. Eventually, Legendary acquired the film and TV rights for Dune in November 2016. Variety reported in December 2016 that Denis Villeneuve was in talks with the studio to direct the film. Villeneuve had expressed his interest in the project in September 2016, saying that "a longstanding dream of mine is to adapt Dune, but it's a long process to get the rights, and I don't think I will succeed". Villeneuve's enthusiasm to direct a Dune film earned Parent's respect, who called Villeneuve, and quickly hired him after Villeneuve described his vision for the film to her. He chose to complete his other films, such as Arrival (2016) and Blade Runner 2049 (2017), as he wanted to spend more time to develop the film and co-write it himself. He also felt "Dune is my world" due to his background in directing science fiction films. By February 2017, Villeneuve was officially confirmed to be directing the film.

Some of Villeneuve's previous collaborators on Arrival and Blade Runner 2049 returned for  Dune, including film editor Joe Walker, production designer Patrice Vermette, visual effects supervisor Paul Lambert, sound designer and editor Theo Green, sound editor Mark Mangini, and special effects supervisor Gerd Nefzer. Other previous collaborators were slated to work on Dune but dropped out before production began, including visual effects supervisor John Nelson and cinematographer Roger Deakins, who was replaced in December 2018 with Greig Fraser. Dune was produced by Villeneuve, Parent, and Cale Boyter, with Tanya Lapointe, Brian Herbert, Byron Merritt, Kim Herbert, Thomas Tull, Jon Spaihts, Richard P. Rubinstein, John Harrison, and Herbert W. Gain serving as executive producers and Kevin J. Anderson as creative consultant. Game of Thrones language creator David J. Peterson was confirmed to be developing languages for the film in April 2019.

Writing
In March 2018, Villeneuve stated that his goal was to adapt the novel into a two-part film series. He secured a two-movie deal with Warner Bros. Pictures, in the same style as the two-part adaptation of Stephen King's It in 2017 and in 2019. He chose to make two films as he felt that the novel was too large and complex for one. Subsequent dealings secured the production of the first film and new production deals were made to start production for the second.

Eric Roth was hired to co-write the screenplay in April, and Jon Spaihts was later confirmed to be co-writing the script alongside Roth and Villeneuve. By May 2018, Villeneuve finished a first draft of the script. Brian Herbert also reiterated that the latest draft covered the first half of Dune by July 2018. Legendary CEO Joshua Grode confirmed in April 2019 that they plan to make a sequel, adding that "there's a logical place to stop the [first] movie before the book is over".

Villeneuve had seen Lynch's adaptation of Dune, and respected both Lynch and the film, but chose not to build on any elements from it, saying "I'm going back to the book, and going to the images that came out when I read it". He elaborated on this, adding that "there are parts that I love and other elements that I am less comfortable with. So it's like, I remember being half-satisfied", and felt he had to make the film with a "different sensibility". Furthermore, he also chose not to incorporate concepts that Jodorowsky had laid out for his attempt for a Dune film in the mid-1970s, as he felt it would be "very presumptuous and arrogant for me to try." He later explained that previous adaptations of the novel did not fully intimidate him, as he felt that his love for Dune allowed him to focus on his own vision. He compared his experience of making the film to archaeology, describing the process as "going back in time and finding those images mixed with emotions, and bringing them back to life and trying to honor them as much as possible."

In adapting the book for a contemporary audience, Villeneuve wanted to reflect on realities that have happened since that time related to contemporary over-exploitation of the Earth, and he considered his screenplay "a coming-of-age story, but also a call for action for the youth". He sought to streamline many parts of the novel for the film, and also wanted to keep "the atmosphere and poetry of the book intact". This included eliminating internal monologues and epigraphs used in the book and simplifying the "pseudo-antiquated" dialogue. Instead, he focused the story around Paul and Jessica, giving them a secret hand gesture language they could use to communicate silently to each other. The film also minimizes many of the aspects around the Emperor and the politics surrounding the Imperium, as he believed he could keep the scope of the novel and its exploration of how power is used, while still keeping the focus on Paul's coming-of-age story.

Some characters were given less prominence, such as Baron Harkonnen, members of his court, and the Mentats Thufir Hawat and Piter De Vries, but established enough so that they can be used in the future. He also wanted to move the Baron from being a caricature, as he was presented in the novel, to a more complex antagonist. Another major change was altering some of the arcs of the female characters in the book to give them more respect and prominence, as Villeneuve felt femininity was a crucial theme in the book. According to Rebecca Ferguson, "Denis was very respectful of Frank's work in the book, [but] the quality of the arcs for [many] of the women have been brought up to a new level. There were some shifts he did, and they are beautifully portrayed now." Lady Jessica was given an expanded role as a soldier and member of the Bene Gesserit. As such, the studio labeled this role a "warrior priestess", in contrast to the joking label of "space nun" that Villeneuve felt was implied by the book. The leading role of Fremen ecologist Dr. Liet-Kynes, a male character in the novel, was given to actress Sharon Duncan-Brewster to help expand the cast diversity.

Casting

It was reported that Timothée Chalamet had entered final negotiations to play the lead in the film, Paul Atreides, in July 2018. Rebecca Ferguson entered negotiations to play Atreides' mother, Lady Jessica, in September 2018. She confirmed her casting in January 2019.

Dave Bautista, Stellan Skarsgård, Charlotte Rampling, Oscar Isaac, and Zendaya joined the cast in January 2019. Javier Bardem, Josh Brolin, Jason Momoa, and David Dastmalchian were cast in February 2019. Stephen McKinley Henderson joined in March, with Chang Chen entering negotiations.

In July 2019, it was reported that the film would "gender swap" the character Liet-Kynes by casting Sharon Duncan-Brewster for the role. Her casting was confirmed in April 2020. The idea to change Kynes's gender was suggested by Jon Spaihts, which Villeneuve promptly accepted. According to Duncan-Brewster, Villeneuve felt it was necessary to capture the essence of the character from the book, but was not necessary to remain consistent with all other facets, and thus opted for this change.

Design

Set and props 
The set design for the film was done by production designer Patrice Vermette. Vermette stated that the set design for Dune would be guided by the need "to ground the story into realistic settings to help the audience believe in the extraordinary elements". They sought to make the sets as realistic and immersive as possible, and used minimal set extension, and no greenscreens. Prior to the creation of any sets or any visual effects for the film, Villeneuve and a team of select people, including his storyboard artist, and later, concept artist Deak Ferrand, worked together to define the visual language for the film, while Vermette created a "visual bible" to guide the development of the set design and to keep it consistent with the visual effects design used throughout the film and eventually later "came on board to extrapolate the world". He also re-read the novel, as he felt that "the book gives a lot of clues or cues that will help you navigate it to design things, but it's quite nonspecific", adding that he wanted to support Villeneuve's original vision of the novel when he read it as a young teenager, and base the design around Herbert's original novel.  The team's early mood boards for the visual language of the film consisted of a variety of images, including ziggurat architecture from Mesopotamia, Egyptian references, bunkers from World War II, brutalist architecture from Brazil and the Soviet Union, megastructures conceived by Superstudio, marble mines, power dams, and imagery of glaciers taking over mountains.

The design for the ornithopthers was conceived by Villeneuve and storyboard artist Sam Hudecki. Villeneuve wanted the ornithopther to resemble a dragonfly and helicopter, describing it as "muscular", but also wanting it to be realistic, adding that he wanted the vehicles to "obey the laws of nature, gravity, and physics". He noted that he thought the overall world of Dune was retro-futuristic and analog. He wanted his team to design the cockpits in a way so that it allowed the actors inside to "always be in visual contact with the landscape and feeling the impact of the landscape seen from above". Two ornithopther models, 48 and 75 feet long, were created for filming by London propmakers. The models were functional, with the doors and interior cockpit area being operable. The models weighed over 11 tons, and required an Antonov cargo plane to ship them to filming locations in Hungary and Jordan. One ornithopter, nicknamed "The Bucket", that was used in shooting had customizable pieces, which allowed for more space during filming. Cranes were also used to make the models fly, as in a scene which involves Paul and Gurney watching a sandworm consume the spice harvester. He added that though it was difficult to use ornithopthers for filming, he felt it was "quite rewarding to see them in position in the desert".

Many practical sets for the film were created on the soundstages and backlots of Origo Film Studios located in Budapest, Hungary, which served as interiors for the three planets. In the design for Caladan, Vermette wanted to give the planet "a feeling of melancholia". He wanted the planet to feel closer to the autumn season in Canada, which was his home country, as he thought that it represented "the end of a cycle... or the beginning of a new one", and also noted its juxtaposition with the planet Arrakis. He also ultimately felt that the planet was defined by "dramatic coastal mountain ranges and cliffs", with forests that contained Norwegian pines. Meanwhile, the interior sets of Caladan were inspired by medieval Japanese aesthetics, particularly the overall layout of Paul's training room, with its intricate screens and diffused lighting. Props within the set were created by set decorator Richard Roberts, including custom-made furniture, lighting, textiles made in Denmark, and other props designed to look antique.

The original design for the sandworm was deemed "prehistoric", inspired by whales with a mouth filled with baleen and following the underwater movements of whales. The skin texture of the sandworm was based on tree bark and mud flats. Vermette spoke of the challenges involved in creating the set designs used for the sandworms, stating "It was a creature that commanded respect, and it’s almost seen as a deity in the world of the Fremen. So that’s why the first time you see the depiction of the sand worm on the mural, it’s presented with sun coming out of its mouth".

The design for Arrakeen was influenced by the book's description of Arrakis's climate, stating that "it’s the biggest residency ever built by humankind", and that it is also "a response as a colonial entity that took over the planet for the exploitation of a natural resource, the spice". He designed the city in a "rock bowl" shape to protect the infrastructure from the sandworms, and the buildings were built at an angle to protect it against the high windspeeds on the planet. He also made the building walls thick, as it results in a coolness inside. The team was inspired by World War II bunkers, Mayan temples, and Brazilian modernism. The history and culture of the Fremen was also indicated through various murals located throughout the residence, which he felt was "like in a church, the way you see a history in the stained glass, I thought maybe they had created murals telling the story of the colonizing of the planet — but those would probably have been created by Fremen artists." One practical set was the environmental lab in which Sardaukar soldiers descend from the air. The circular dome was 20 feet high, with the spokes being created by a special kind of cloth fabric, which created the illusion of shadows and properly lit the actors, while agriculturally controlled sand was placed on the ground as filming took place during Budapest's raining season.

Costumes 
Over 1000 looks for Arrakis, Caladan, and Giedi Prime were designed by the team for the film. The costume design for the film was done by Jacqueline West and Bob Morgan. Villeneuve told West that he wanted the costumes to be "grounded" in history, and wanted them to avoid conventional futuristic views used in science fiction films, and put emphasis of giving a "philosophical" atmosphere to the film. West performed "psychological studies of the characters and digging into the past for symbolic analogs to the various houses’ identities", which aided her in creating the costumes. Her design was inspired primarily by the Middle Ages, saying "I would go to the medieval world and imagine what it would look like in the future", and used the term "mod-eval" to describe her approach to designing the costumes. She found similarities between the Fremen and the French Resistance, and called the Sardaukar the "Nazis of this universe", and took inspiration from various painters, including Giotto, Francisco Goya, and Caravaggio, and British art historian John Berger. She also took cues from the fashion of Balenciaga, and the Bedouin and Tuareg people.

The Spacing Guild was based on the Avignon Papacy, as she found a similarity between the two, feeling that "they [Avignon Papacy] persecuted the Templars, and I always thought the House Atreides was betrayed by the Emperor and his people", and said she "took pictures of the paintings of all the medieval popes and gave it a modern take". The Bene Gesserit sorceresses were based on tarot cards and chess pieces, while the Harkonnen's armors was designed to resemble a bug's shell, and used "a lot of books of medieval drawings of insects, spiders, ants, praying mantises and lizards" as reference. The design for the Atreides's costumes was based around the Romanovs, as she felt "it was the end of an empire", and described their costumes as having a "simplicity about them that was regal". Meanwhile, she based Lady Jessica's dresses in the first half of the film on fashion designer, Cristóbal Balenciaga, while the turmeric-toned gown she wears while landing on Arrakis, which was chain-linked by Bryony Tyrell, was influenced by Middle Eastern clothing and paintings of women in North Africa. She opened the chain link in the dress, which she said was "almost Bedouin in feeling. It gave her some power, but yet it kept her mysterious", and added that overall, she had to "embody all of those somewhat contradictory things in her costumes".

West said she also researched the works of David Lean, such as Lawrence of Arabia (1962) and Doctor Zhivago (1965), and also Fahrenheit 451 (1966), which were used to further inspire the diversity of costumes included in the film. She also researched Roman and Greek mythology, as she felt that "there was a connection there with House Atreides and House Harkonnen", which she thought "seemed like a kind of a real Greek and Roman tragedy on one level". She dyed the gauze for the Fremen in the desert colors, which was inspired by the color of sand and rocks in the Jordanian filming locations, as she felt that it highlighted the movement and shapes of people's bodies.  A prototype for the stillsuit was designed by West and Jose Fernandez at Ironhead Studios in Los Angeles. Morgan then took Fernandez's prototype, and set up a factory in Origo Studios in an airplane hangar, where additional suits were designed, over a period of two weeks. He hired artisans from across Europe, who created concept designs and over 150 individual pieces for the suits. Over 250 stillsuits were used when filming in Jordan. The suits were designed so that they could be flexible and fit the actor's body, while ensuring that they remained accurate to the novel throughout the process. They created "micro-sandwiches" consisting of acrylic fibers and porous cottons, which absorbed the moisture of the suits and allowed the actors to be cool inside the suits. Tubing also ran through the micro-sandwiches, for increased flexibility. Zippers and buttons were not used on costumes, as it was deemed to be "archaic".

Filming 
Principal photography began on March 18, 2019, at Origo Film Studios in Budapest, Hungary, with Greig Fraser serving as cinematographer. The film was shot for the IMAX format with an IMAX-certified Arri Alexa LF camera and an IMAX-certified Alexa Mini LF prototype, equipped with Panavision's large-format lenses in the Ultra Vista and H-series lineup, with select scenes seeing the aspect ratio opened up to 1.90:1 on all IMAX screens, and to 1.43:1 on select IMAX screens outfitted with IMAX's dual-laser projection system. The finished footage was transferred to 35mm film stock, then scanned back to 4K, in order to achieve a more film-like look.

Parts of the Arrakeen invasion, such as the shots of Gurney, extras, and practical explosions, which were approximately five kilometers high, were filmed on backlots in Budapest. The interiors of ornithopters were filmed on hilltops outside Budapest, with a 25-foot high and 360-degree sand colored ramp circling a large gimbal, which the team called the "dog collar". This allowed Fraser to film with the natural sunlight, which Villeneuve wanted. Filming also took place in Wadi Rum, Jordan, which doubled for Arrakis. The Liwa Oasis in the United Arab Emirates also served as a key backdrop for Arrakis. The film shot there for 11 days, with assistance being offered from local businesses and freelancers from Two Four 54 and crews consisting of over 100 people. Footage of helicopters flying over the UAE were also filmed, with six high-resolution cameras attached, which was used as reference for the ornithopters. Scenes featuring rock formations Fremens used as shelters from the heat were filmed at the Rub' al Khali desert in Abu Dhabi.  Filming occurred in Stadlandet, Norway, doubling for the planet Caladan. Filming wrapped on July 26, 2019. Additional filming took place in Budapest by August 2020. It was not expected to alter the film's previous December 2020 release date.

Visual effects 

DNEG contributed to over 28 scenes in the film, and created 1,200 VFX shots out of the 1,700 total, with vendors including Wylie Co. and Rodeo FX. Many shots used various chroma key process. Visual effects supervisor Paul Lambert used "sandscreens" for filming scenes in Arrakis and Arrakeen; instead of using green-based backgrounds, the visual effects team used sand-colored ones that matched the establishing desert shots intended for backgrounds. The sandscreens were used in capturing scenes of the ornithopter. The VFX team used the helicopter footage and later replaced them with the actual ornithopter models. This made the sand displacement, such as when it lands and takes off, easier to capture. Sand displacement via the ornithopters' movements were also filmed by encapsulating the ornithopter models in a black box with fans blowing dust around. The wings were also added in post using computer-generated imagery (CGI). Similar processes were used to film scenes in Caladan, as "grayscreens," in addition to those with a "slight blue tint", were used for filming interior and exterior scenes, respectively. Bluescreens were used for Salusa Secundus scenes. He further went on to explain that different colored screens were used depending on the imagery of the foreground and background, which made compositing them together easier. The resulting shots also appeared more natural than with other chroma keys. Approximately 18 tons of sand and dust were used on set, and the team created the effect of the sand blowing by attaching a V8 engine with a fan on the back of a tractor.

The sandworms were created through CGI. The VFX team found a lot of difficulty in deciding how the sandworm would move. The team spent over a year in figuring out the movements of the sandworm, and researched the body movements of various animals, such as worms and snakes, in order to help them decide on the movement. The sand ripples created by the worms were inspired by Jaws (1975).  The special-effects supervisor, Gerd Nefzer, designed a vibrating 8x8 foot steel plate, and placed it under the sand, which resulted in the formation of various patterns, and was used to signify an approaching sandworm. The vibrating areas were also later enhanced to cover a larger area. The team considered using rigged explosives to capture the motion of the sandworms breaking the surface in the desert, but as this was impractical to perform in the Middle East, they instead used Houdini software to have sand mimic the motion of water. Villeneuve did not want the sound associated with these special effects to sound as a studio production. Sound designers Mark Mangini and Theo Green used a "fake documentary realism" approach to capture natural sounds and manipulate them for use in the film, such as recording the sounds of shifting sands in Death Valley using hydrophones.

The Montreal and Vancouver facilities of DNEG were used for the Arrakeen invasion sequence. It involved the combination of practical and digital effects. The VFX supervisor of the Montreal team, Brian Connor, created a digital Arrakeen space port, while the Vancouver team was tasked with simulating the explosions. Practical explosions filmed in the Budapest backlots were later enhanced by the VFX team, as the special effects team had a rig of practical lights shining through the fog from the practical explosions, which allowed the VFX team to then blend the practical and digital shots together more easily. Lambert created the visual effects for the shields by combining past and future frames after experimenting with a clip from Seven Samurai (1954), which resulted in a "shimmering" look that Villeneuve approved. The team also added colors; they used blue for when an object bounces off and red for when it penetrates. The scene of Paul's future vision was filmed using motion-capture, and the team replicated the mo-cap to add hundreds of fighters to the scene. Animation supervisor Robyn Luckham helped create the scene as the team didn't know much about mo-cap. They also added explosions in the foreground, sandworms in the background, sand displacement throughout the scenes, and used more simulations to render the scene in real-time. To create the desert mouse, Muad'Dib, the team created a practical stuffy model, which was very detailed, and filmed in Jordan for the appropriate desert lighting. The animation team also used footage of animals idling for reference, and animated the mouse so that it "only expends effort when absolutely necessary".  The creosote bush hologram in the film was created by projecting different "slices" of the light on Chalamet's face during plate photography based on his position on the set using a projector. Wylie then completed the scene in post by adding the hologram around him. For the hunter-seeker, the team used a stick on set as reference, and later replaced it with the CGI version in post. Practical rigs were attached to Skarsgård's body to create the illusion of the Baron's levitation. Sometimes, the levitation was done practically with an actual seesaw rig. His suspensor device attached to his back was done using CGI.

The film was finished by being printed onto negative 35mm film stock and then transferred back to digital to give the image film grain and texture.

Music 

Hans Zimmer affirmed he would be scoring Dune near the start of the film's production in March 2019. Zimmer had previously worked with Villeneuve on Blade Runner 2049. At the time, Zimmer had been approached by Christopher Nolan for composing on his then-upcoming film Tenet, but Zimmer opted for Dune, citing his personal love for the book as the reason. Zimmer did not want the soundtrack to sound like his previous works and used instruments atypical of a Western orchestra, an approach he called "anti-groove". He avoided watching Lynch's Dune so as not to be influenced by Toto's music, instead spending a week in a desert in Utah to incorporate its sounds into the score. The music was performed using an eclectic set of instruments, including some that were created specifically for the soundtrack. Performers for the score include guitarist Guthrie Govan and vocalist Loire Cotler. Additional music was composed by Steve Mazzaro and David Fleming, both of whom worked in collaboration with Zimmer to keep his pieces on theme. Among the soundtrack pieces include bagpipes for the House Atreides theme. Zimmer said the idea of the House using bagpipes was Villeneuve's idea of something "ancient and organic". Zimmer was able to find thirty bagpipe players around Edinburgh amid the COVID-19 pandemic and recorded them playing in a church.

For the first Dune trailer, Zimmer supervised a 32-person choir via FaceTime (necessitated by pandemic restrictions) for the recording of a cover of Pink Floyd's song "Eclipse". Choir members gathered in groups of four over eight separate sessions in Santa Monica at Zimmer's Remote Control studio while Zimmer conducted from home.

Three soundtrack albums were released for the film by WaterTower Music, including The Dune Sketchbook (Music from the Soundtrack), Dune (Original Motion Picture Soundtrack), and The Art and Soul of Dune on September 3, September 17, and October 22, 2021, respectively. Villeneuve said Zimmer spent "months and months creating new instruments, defining, creating, and seeking new sounds, pushing the envelope" and praised his work on the film. Two singles were released on July 22, titled "Paul's Dream" and "Ripples in the Sand". The film's score was nominated for the Best Score Soundtrack for Visual Media at the 2022 Grammy Awards.

Marketing
Vanity Fair published a two-part extensive first-look report on Dune by April 14, 2020. Empire October 2020 issue's cover story included an in-depth look at the film and interviews with cast and crew, providing additional first looks ahead of the film's trailer release. A teaser trailer was released on September 9, 2020, featuring a remix of the Pink Floyd song "Eclipse" (1973) combined with Zimmer's score. Zack Sharf of IndieWire gave the trailer a positive review, and wrote "It's full of eye-popping set design", in addition to stating, "The two [Denis Villeneuve and Greig Fraser] have brought a tangibility to Frank Herbert's world that should make Dune a visceral experience for moviegoers." Miles Surrey from The Ringer also gave the trailer a positive review, and felt the trailer "undoubtedly looks promising" and noted that though the source material has been "notoriously unadaptable", though he felt "the curse could be broken" due to the cast and Villeneuve's direction. Similarly, Deadline Hollywood'''s Dino-Ray Ramos also praised the trailer for its scale, writing that it contained "sci-fi prestige and the epic scale that includes mind-boggling action, elegant cinematography and fantastical nuances that still leave room for grounded and very human storytelling".

The first 10 minutes of the film were screened in select IMAX theaters worldwide on July 21 and 22, 2021, in an event that also included a behind-the-scenes look at the film and the debut of the film's theatrical trailer, on July 22. Angela Wattercutter of Wired stated that the trailer "is begging you to see it in theaters".  Jennifer Yuma from Variety praised the cast and visuals, and praised its scope, calling the trailer "epic". Similarly, Aaron Couch from The Hollywood Reporter also praised the cast and thought the film was an "ambitious sci-fi adaptation". Anthony Breznican from Vanity Fair also gave the trailer a positive review and stated, "It will seem more mysterious to those unfamiliar with the story, but like Chani does herself in those dream missives to Paul, it hints at big, impressive things to come." Vulture's Zoe Haylock was also impressed by the trailer, and advocated watching the film in theaters, praising the visuals as "transcendental natural settings". Writing for Entertainment Weekly, Christian Holub felt the trailer "sets the stage cleanly".

On February 26, 2019, Funcom entered into an exclusive partnership with Legendary Entertainment to develop games related to the upcoming Dune films. In September 2020, McFarlane Toys started a line of 7-inch figures modeled after characters from the film. A 12-inch figure of Baron Harkonnen was introduced at the same time. The action figures were released in December 2020. An artbook, The Art and Soul of Dune, was released alongside the film on October 22, 2021. The book was written by the executive producer Tanya Lapointe, and it included a soundtrack album of the same name composed by Zimmer. The book was available in both a standard and deluxe edition.

 Release 

 Theatrical and streaming Dune was originally scheduled to be released on November 20, 2020, but was pushed back to December 18, 2020. The film was then delayed by the COVID-19 pandemic, this time to October 1, 2021, taking over the release date slot of The Batman, where it was theatrically released in 3D. In late June 2021, Warner Bros. delayed the film's American release date again by three weeks to October 22, 2021, to avoid competition with No Time to Die. Over a month before the domestic North American release date, the film had a staggered theatrical release schedule in most international markets that do not have HBO Max, beginning on September 15, including France, Italy, Sweden and Switzerland. A week ahead of the United States release, Warner Bros. announced that the film's availability on HBO Max would start on the evening of October 21, 2021, correlating with typical early Thursday theatrical showings for films released on Fridays (although the studio had not been doing early Thursday previews for most of the rest of their hybrid theatrical/HBO Max releases. The other exception being The Suicide Squad, which had the same strategy for its early Thursday previews/HBO Max release).

Like all 2021 Warner Bros. films, Dune was streamed simultaneously on HBO Max for a period of one month. The film was then removed from the service and followed the normal home media release schedule, similar to the process Warner Bros. used for Wonder Woman 1984 (2020). Villeneuve was one of several directors, alongside movie theater chains and production companies (including Legendary Entertainment, which produced and financed the film), who expressed disappointment and displeasure over the move. In a column published in Variety, he wrote, "Streaming can produce great content, but not movies of Dunes scope and scale. Warner Bros.' decision means Dune won't have the chance to perform financially in order to be viable and piracy will ultimately triumph... My team and I devoted more than three years of our lives to make it a unique big screen experience. Our movie's image and sound were meticulously designed to be seen in theaters."Dune had its world premiere at the 78th Venice International Film Festival on September 3, 2021. It also screened at the Toronto International Film Festival with an IMAX premiere screening at the Ontario Place Cinesphere on September 11, 2021. Jason Momoa tested positive for COVID-19 after attending the film's London premiere on October 15, 2021. On October 17, the film was leaked online ahead of its planned United States and HBO Max release.

The film returned for a limited theatrical run at IMAX theaters starting on December 3, 2021.

Home media
The film was released digitally on December 3, 2021, while Blu-ray, DVD and Ultra HD Blu-ray versions of the film were released on January 11, 2022, by Warner Bros. Home Entertainment. After its release on home media, Dune ranked first on the "NPD VideoScan First Alert" chart for combined Blu-ray and DVD sales as well as the dedicated Blu-ray sales chart. According to The Numbers, it sold a combined 215,375 Blu-ray and DVD units in the first week for $3.6 million. It retained the top position on both the charts of the NPD Group for the following two weeks before being displaced by Ghostbusters: Afterlife. In addition, it was the most rented title from Redbox kiosks for three weeks as well. It was the highest-selling movie for the month of January according to the "NPD VideoScan First Alert" chart.

Reception
Box officeDune grossed $108.3 million in the United States and Canada, and $293.5 million in other territories, for a worldwide total of $401.8 million. Deadline Hollywood reported that a total box office gross of $300 million, the combined cost of production and marketing, "will make many happy from an image-standpoint, even if breakeven is far north of that."

In the U.S. and Canada, the film made $41 million in its opening weekend from 4,125 theaters, surpassing its projected opening weekend estimates of $30–35 million and besting the debut of Godzilla vs. Kong ($31.6 million) for the highest opening weekend for Warner Bros. during the pandemic era. Of that opening weekend take, $17.5 million came from its first day ticket sales, including $5.1 million from Thursday night previews. Dune also had the best opening of Villeneuve's career. The film fell 62% in its second weekend to $15.5 million, though it remained atop the domestic box office. In its third weekend it dropped by 51% to earn $7.6 million, and was displaced by Eternals from the top rank. On November 25, 2021, Dune became the second Warner Bros. film of the pandemic era to cross $100 million in the US and Canada, following Godzilla vs. Kong.

The film was released in 14 markets outside the US and Canada on September 15, 2021. It grossed $37.9 million, with the largest markets being Russia and CIS ($8.9 million), France ($7.2 million), Germany ($4.4 million), Taiwan ($3.4 million), Italy ($2.5 million) and Spain ($2.4 million). After adding an additional $26.3 million from 32 countries in its second weekend, the film had a 10-day running total of $76.5 million.

In China, Dune opened to a $21.6 million weekend according to estimates by Warner Brothers, ranking second on the country's box office behind The Battle at Lake Changjin. In its fourth week of release outside the US and Canada, the film made $21.4 million in 75 countries, a drop of 54% from the previous weekend. It also fell by 78% to about $5 million in China, dropping to the third rank. The film crossed the $300 million global mark on November 2. During the fifth weekend it earned $11.1 million, a drop of 52%. This included $2.1 million in China where it dropped to the fifth rank.

After its return to IMAX for a week on December 2, the film earned an estimated $1.8 million during the weekend, a drop of 13% from the previous weekend, primarily due to earning around $1 million from IMAX. In Australia it debuted atop the box office chart, earning $3.4 million in the opening weekend. The $400 million global mark was crossed on February 14, 2022, with the largest running-total countries outside the US and Canada being China ($39.5 million), France ($32.6 million), the UK ($30 million), Germany ($22.5 million) and Russia ($21.3 million).

Streaming viewership
According to Samba TV, the film was watched in over 1.9 million US households during its first three days of release, which grew to 2.3 million within its first week of release. 3.9 million US households had watched the film within its first 30 days of release. According to TV Time, it was the most-watched film overall in the United States from the first to the third week of its release consecutively, before dropping to the sixth rank in its fourth week. The film rose to the third rank on TV Time's chart in the final week of its availability. It was the ninth-most-streamed-film of 2021 according to the service. By March 20, the film had been streamed in 5.3 million households in the US, including 996,000 since the Oscar nomination announcements on February 8.

After its release on PVOD services, Dune debuted at the second position on iTunes and Vudu charts, while being ranked seventh on Google Play. The following week it fell to the seventh position on iTunes and the third position on Vudu, while maintaining its ranking on Google Play. After falling out of the charts for two weeks, it found renewed interest as it rose to the tenth position on iTunes, seventh position on Google Play, and the fifth position on Vudu. It however fell out of the iTunes and Google Play charts again in the following week, while dropping to the tenth position on the Vudu chart.

The film was the highest-selling title on Redbox's digital service for the week of January 24–30, 2022. It was also the top-ranked film on iTunes during the same week. Following the Academy Awards nominations, it reentered the top 10 charts for iTunes, Google Play and Vudu.

 Critical response 
  Audiences polled by CinemaScore gave the film an average grade of "A−" on an A+ to F scale, while those at PostTrak gave it an 84% positive score (with an average rating of 4.5 out of 5 stars) and 66% saying they would definitely recommend it.

Following its premiere at the Venice Film Festival in September 2021, early reception was generally positive, with the film receiving praise for its ambition, story, scope and technical prowess. However, it did not resonate with some critics, who felt the story was incomplete and dull.

After its wider release, the film drew praise for its writing and sense of scale, while others criticized the film for being drawn out and for only covering half of the novel. Ben Travis of Empire magazine gave the film five out of five stars and stated, "An absorbing, awe-inspiringly huge adaptation of (half of) Frank Herbert's novel that will wow existing acolytes, and get newcomers hooked on its Spice-fuelled visions. If Part Two never happens, it'll be a travesty." Robbie Collin of The Daily Telegraph also gave the film a five-star rating, calling it "majestic, unsettling and enveloping". Xan Brooks of The Guardian referred to the film in his five-star review as "dense, moody and quite often sublime – the missing link bridging the multiplex and the arthouse". In a positive review, Justin Chang of the Los Angeles Times wrote, "Villeneuve draws you into an astonishingly vivid, sometimes plausibly unnerving vision of the future." Leah Greenblatt of Entertainment Weekly, who graded the film a B, wrote that Dune "is exactly the kind of lush, lofty filmmaking wide screens were made for; a sensory experience so opulent and overwhelming it begs to be seen big, or not at all" and added, "The sheer awesomeness of Villeneuve's execution ... often obscures the fact that the plot is mostly prologue: a sprawling origin story with no fixed beginning or end."

Other critics commented on issues related to pacing and handling of the source material. Critic Owen Gleiberman of Variety wrote: "It's an act of world-building that runs out of storytelling steam ... Dune is out to wow us, and sometimes succeeds, but it also wants to get under your skin like a hypnotically toxic mosquito ... as the movie begins to run out of tricks, it turns woozy and amorphous." Kevin Maher of The Times gave two out of five stars, stating that while "every frame ... is spectacular", "Dune is also kind of boring". Reviewing the film for TheWrap, Steve Pond called the film "both dazzling and frustrating, often spectacular and often slow" and said, "This version of Dune sometimes feels as if it aims to impress you more than entertain you; it's grim on a staggering level, ditching most of the fun of sci-fi yarns in favor of a worldview that feels more like Villeneuve's Sicario or Prisoners than his Arrival."

Some reviewers criticized the film for pulling back from the Arabic and Islamic influences that Herbert had used within the novel but still appropriating these elements, as well as the lack of casting of Middle Eastern or North African (MENA) actors. Spaihts stated that they had to pull back on their use of Arabic culture embedded in the novel for the film; "The Arab world was much more exotic in the 1960s than it is today. Today the Arab world is with us, they're our fellow Americans, they're everywhere … If you were to build a kind of Arab future on Arrakis in a novel starting today, you would need to invent more and borrow less." Despite this shift, the film was still found by critics to be heavily influenced by Middle Eastern culture and to be troubled by its lack of MENA casting. Serena Rasoul, the founder of Muslim American Casting, called the lack of MENA actors an "erasure", and "You don't cast MENA or Muslim actors, yet you profit off their culture. That's where it's painful for us as creatives. ... It means that we are not good enough to be part of the film." The resulting film was seen as more orientalist as a result. Additionally, while the original novel was considered by some to have elements of the white savior narrative, the lack of MENA representation in addition to the actors of African descent in roles of characters that were killed off to protect Paul and Jessica were seen to propagate this white savior narrative further within Villeneuve's film, according to Ali Karjoo-Ravary, an assistant professor in Islamic studies of Bucknell University. When asked about the white savior narrative, Villeneuve stated what his intent with the film was: "It's a critique of that. It's not a celebration of a savior. It's a criticism of the idea of a savior, of someone that will come and tell another population how to be, what to believe. It's not a condemnation, but a criticism. So that's the way I feel it's relevant, and that can be seen as contemporary."

AccoladesDune was nominated for ten Academy Awards (winning six), three Golden Globe Awards (winning one), eleven British Academy Film Awards (winning five), ten Critics' Choice Movie Awards (winning three), two AACTA International Awards (winning one), ten Satellite Awards (winning five), one Grammy Award, one Hollywood Music in Media Awards (won), four People's Choice Awards, one Screen Actors Guild Awards, three Dorian Awards (winning one), and one Nickelodeon Kids' Choice Award (won), among others. It was also ranked as one of the top ten films of 2021 by the American Film Institute (AFI).

Future
 Dune: Part Two (2023) 

Villeneuve intended to make a two-part adaptation of the novel, and by November 2019, Jon Spaihts left his position as showrunner on Dune: The Sisterhood to focus on writing the sequel film. Villeneuve felt that Warner Bros.' decision in December 2020 to simultaneously release their 2021 films through HBO Max alongside a theatrical release due to the impact of the COVID-19 pandemic on cinema could compromise the film's financial performance, resulting in the cancellation of the sequel, though Warner Bros. assured him a sequel would be greenlit as long as the film performed well on HBO Max. In February 2021, Eric Roth stated that he has written a full treatment for the potential sequel, with writing beginning that August. Following the success of the film, Warner Bros. and Legendary Pictures officially greenlit Dune: Part Two in October 2021. After the sequel was greenlit, Villeneuve's main concern was to finish the production, which would benefit from all the work on the first part.

Preliminary filming started in Italy in early July 2022, with primary filming in Budapest to begin later that month.

 Potential third film 

Villeneuve expressed interest in making a third film based on Dune Messiah, saying that its possibility depended on the success of Dune: Part Two.

 Dune: The Sisterhood 

In June 2019, Legendary Television announced it is producing a spin-off series, Dune: The Sisterhood'', for WarnerMedia's streaming service, HBO Max. The series serves as a prequel to the film and centers on the Bene Gesserit. Initially, Villeneuve was going to direct the series' pilot, with Spaihts writing the screenplay and Dana Calvo as showrunner for the series. In November 2019, Spaihts left the series as writer to focus on the sequel film. Spaihts and Villeneuve remain as executive producers along with Brian Herbert, Byron Merritt, and Kim Herbert. In July 2021, Diane Ademu-John took over as showrunner. Spaihts and Villeneuve confirmed in March 2022 that the show is still in development. In April 2022, it was announced that Johan Renck will direct the first two episodes. Travis Fimmel joined the cast in November 2022.

References

External links 

 
 
 Official screenplay
 

2021 films
2020s science fiction adventure films
2020s American films
2020s English-language films
2021 3D films
2021 science fiction films
American epic films
American science fiction adventure films
American space adventure films
American space opera films
Films about families
Films about mother–son relationships
Films based on American novels
Films based on Dune (franchise)
Films based on science fiction novels
Films directed by Denis Villeneuve
Films postponed due to the COVID-19 pandemic
Films scored by Hans Zimmer
Films set in deserts
Films set in the future
Films set on fictional planets
Films shot in Budapest
Films shot in Jordan
Films shot in Norway
Films shot in the United Arab Emirates
Films that won the Best Original Score Academy Award
Films that won the Best Sound Mixing Academy Award
Films that won the Best Visual Effects Academy Award
Films whose art director won the Best Art Direction Academy Award
Films whose cinematographer won the Best Cinematography Academy Award
Films whose editor won the Best Film Editing Academy Award
Films with screenplays by Eric Roth
Hugo Award for Best Dramatic Presentation, Long Form winning works
IMAX films
Legendary Pictures films
Planetary romances
Remakes of American films
Science fiction film remakes
Soft science fiction films
Warner Bros. films
Films about coups d'état
Race-related controversies in film